Gasfinolhu may refer to:

 Gasfinolhu (Alif Dhaal Atoll) (Republic of Maldives)
 Gasfinolhu (Kaafu Atoll) (Republic of Maldives)
 Gasfinolhu (Laamu Atoll) (Republic of Maldives)